Registry may refer to:

Computing
 Container registry, an operating-system-level virtualization registry
 Domain name registry, a database of top-level internet domain names
 Local Internet registry
 Metadata registry, information system for registering metadata
 National Internet registry
 Regional Internet registry, a database of allocated Internet number resources in a particular region of the world
 Windows Registry, a database of configuration settings in Microsoft Windows operating systems
 Service List Registry, an audiovisual service discovery platform

Gifts
 Gift registry, a particular type of wish list, e.g., for anniversaries, birthdays, graduations, honeymoons, housewarmings, showers, weddings
 Bridal registry, a retailers' plan that allows engaged couples to manage the purchase of wedding gifts
 Honeymoon registry, a service that assists engaged and married couples in financing their honeymoons

Government and law
 A registry is an authoritative list of one kind of information. Registries normally contain fields with a unique ID, so that the record can be referenced from other documents and registries 
 Civil registry, a government record of vital events (for example, births, deaths and marriages)
 Land registry, an official record of land ownership
 Registry of Motor Vehicles, a government agency that administers the registration of automobiles
 Sex offender registry, a system to allow government authorities to keep track of sex offenders
 Permanent residence registry, a legislative provision that allows an illegal entrant to become a lawful permanent resident by virtue of having continuously resided in the United States since before a specified date
 Registry fee, a postal fee paid to send registered mail
 The Registry, a risk management tool used by landlords to screen prospective renters

Health and medicine
 Cancer registry, a systematic collection of data about cancer and tumor diseases
 NREMT or National Registry of Emergency Medical Technicians, which establishes and verifies entry-level competence for American first responders, emergency medical technicians and paramedics
 Nurse registry, a licensed staffing agency that provides hospitals and individuals with nursing personnel
 American Joint Replacement Registry, an organization that collects and reports hip and knee replacement data to provide actionable information to guide physicians and patient decision making to improve care
 Patient registry, an organised system that uses observational methods to collect uniform data on a population defined by a particular disease, condition, or exposure, and that is followed over time

Other uses
 Breed registry, a record of the ancestry and ownership of purebred animals
 Family registry, a registry used in many countries to track information of genealogical or legal interest
 Survivor registry, a website where people in an area affected by a terrorist attack can post a message saying they are okay
 The Social Registry, a record label

See also
 Register (disambiguation)
 Registrar (disambiguation)
 Social Register (film)
 Social Register

de:Register
it:Registro
hu:Registry
ja:レジストリ
fi:Rekisteri